Marijonas Petravičius (born October 24, 1979) is a Lithuanian retired professional basketball player. He was a member of the Lithuania national team. He mainly played the center position, but he could also play the power forward position.

Professional career

With his former club Mitteldeutscher BC, he won the FIBA EuroCup Challenge in 2004, being the Final Four MVP.

Petravičius arrived to Lietuvos rytas Vilnius in 2006, to replace Robertas Javtokas who left the team, and he quickly became the first choice center for the team. He helped Lietuvos rytas to reach the EuroCup final in 2007. In 2008 the team was competing in the EuroLeague, and in his first game Petravičius scored 29 points against Armani Jeans Milano.

Petravičius led Rytas to first place during the group stage, but unfortunately during a practice Petravičius suffered a foot injury. With the club's three leaders injured: himself, Matthew Nielsen and Roberts Štelmahers, Rytas failed to enter the EuroLeague quarterfinals. He was named the EuroCup Finals MVP in 2009.

He joined the Italian club Armani Jeans Milano in 2009.

In August 2011, he agreed to terms with the Turkish team Beşiktaş Cola Turka Istanbul. However, Beşiktaş gave up on signing him after he was diagnosed with a lung problem. Later he signed a contract with Azovmash Mariupol, however he asked to wait one month due to personal reasons. Azovmash declined to wait one month for him and terminated the contract.

On 16 January 2012 Petravičius signed with Khimki Moscow Region. He debuted in Khimki on 28 January 2012. He played only 5 minutes and scored 2 points, grabbed 1 rebound and made one assist, but he also made two turnovers and got one foul. However, this was his first and the last one game in Khimki, because his disease renewed. On 17 February 2012 Khimki terminated contract with Petravičius.

EuroLeague career statistics

|-
| style="text-align:left;"| 2007–08
| style="text-align:left;"| Lietuvos Rytas
| 17 || 16 || 25.1 || style="background:#CFECEC;"|.722 || .000 || .741 || 5.6 || .3 || .6 || .4 || 13.5 || 15.7
|-
| style="text-align:left;"| 2009–10
| style="text-align:left;"| Milano
| 8 || 4 || 18.5 || .617 || .000 || .756 || 3.3 || .6 || .4 || .3 || 9.1 || 10.4
|-
| style="text-align:left;"| 2010–11
| style="text-align:left;"| Milano
| 5 || 4 || 15.4 || .630 || .000 || .700 || 3.2 || .0 || .4 || .0 || 8.2 || 6.8
|- class="sortbottom"
| style="text-align:center;" colspan=2 | Career
| 30 || 24 || 21.7 || .699 || .000 || .743 || 4.6 || .5 || .3 || .3 || 11.4 || 12.8

National team career
Petravičius was a member of the senior Lithuanian national basketball team at the 2008 Summer Olympics tournament, where Lithuania finished in 4th place. He also participated in EuroBasket 2009 and EuroBasket 2011. During the latter tournament, however, he was forced to leave the team due to being diagnosed with a pulmonary embolism.

Awards and achievements
 FIBA Europe Cup Champion: 2004
 FIBA Europe Cup Final Four MVP: 2004
 LBL Champion: 2006
 BBL Champion: 2007
 EuroLeague MVP of the Week runner up (scoring 29 points-career high): 2007
 BBL Vice-Champion: 2008
 LKL Vice-Champion: 2007, 2008
 LKF Vice-Champion: 2007, 2008
 LKF Cup Champion: 2009
 EuroCup Champion: 2009
 EuroCup Finals MVP: 2009

References

External links
EuroLeague Profile
EuroCup Profile

1979 births
Living people
Basketball players at the 2008 Summer Olympics
BC Azovmash players
BC Khimki players
BC Oostende players
BC Rytas players
BC Šilutė basketball players
BK Ventspils players
Centers (basketball)
Lithuanian expatriate basketball people in Belgium
Lithuanian expatriate basketball people in Ukraine
Lithuanian expatriate basketball people in Germany
Lithuanian expatriate basketball people in Italy
Lithuanian expatriate basketball people in the United States
Lithuanian men's basketball players
Mitteldeutscher BC players
Olimpia Milano players
Olympic basketball players of Lithuania
People from Šilalė
Power forwards (basketball)
Samogitian Roman Catholics
South Carolina Gamecocks men's basketball players